Poland has a rich selection of Gold and Silver commemorative coins. In the year 2008 coins were launched in the series: "Animals of the World", "Monuments of Material Culture in Poland" (previously "Castles and Palaces in Poland"), "Polish Painters of the Turn of 19th and 20th Centuries", "The Polish Calendar of Traditional Customs and Rituals", "History of the Polish Zloty", and various occasional coins.

Table of contents

See also

 Numismatics
 Regular issue coinage
 Coin grading

References

Commemorative coins of Poland